Peter Cowan (born 1 April 1954) is a South African cricketer. He played in one first-class match for Border in 1981/82.

See also
 List of Border representative cricketers

References

External links
 

1954 births
Living people
South African cricketers
Border cricketers
Cricketers from Cape Town